Gold Digger, Gold Diggers or The Gold Diggers may refer to:

Gold digger, someone who engages in romantic relationships for money rather than love

Film and television
 Golddigger (film), a 1914 Hungarian film
 The Gold Diggers (1923 film), a Warner Bros. silent film
 Gold Diggers of 1933, a Warner Bros. musical
 Gold Diggers of 1935
 Gold Diggers of 1937
 Gold Diggers in Paris
 The Gold Diggers (1983 film), a film by Sally Potter
 Gold Diggers: The Secret of Bear Mountain, a 1995 film
 National Lampoon's Gold Diggers, a 2003 film
 Gold Digger (TV series), an 2019 British drama miniseries

 Gold Diggers (TV series), an 2019 Russian drama series

Literature
 The Gold Diggers (Aleichem play), a 1908 Yiddish theatre play
 The Gold Diggers (1919 play), a play by Avery Hopwood
 Gold Digger (comics), a comic book series by Fred Perry
 The Gold Diggers, a 1954 book of poetry by Robert Creeley
 Gold Diggers, a 2021 novel by Sanjena Sathian

Music
 The Golddiggers, an all-girl singing and dancing troupe that appeared on The Dean Martin Show
 "Gold Digger" (EPMD song) (1990)
 "Gold Digger" (Dolly Rockers song) (2009)
 "Gold Digger" (Kanye West song) (2005)
 "Golddiggers", a 2004 song by Günther from Pleasureman
 "Gold Digger", a 2004 song by Ludacris from the film Shark Tale
 "Golddigger", a 2005 song by Armin van Buuren from Shivers

Other uses
 Gold Digger (horse) (1962–1990), an American Thoroughbred racehorse
 Søllerød Gold Diggers, an American football team from Rudersdal, Denmark

See also
 Gigolo, a male companion who is supported by a woman
 Gold mining
 Hypergamy, the practice of marrying someone of higher status
 Trophy wife, a young and attractive wife of an older or unattractive but wealthy husband